José David Velásquez Colón (born 8 December 1989) is a Honduran footballer who currently plays for C.D. Real Sociedad in the Liga National De Honduras.

Club career
Velásquez started his career with hometown club Victoria and has not changed clubs since. In December 2012 however, it was rumoured Velásquez was ready to join Major League Soccer club Seattle Sounders FC.

International career
Velásquez was picked for the Honduras Olympic team which competed in the 2012 Summer Olympics. He made his senior debut for Honduras in an April 2012 friendly match against Costa Rica and has, as of February 2013, earned a total of 2 caps, scoring no goals.

References

External links

1989 births
Living people
People from La Ceiba
Association football defenders
Honduran footballers
Honduran expatriate footballers
Honduras international footballers
Olympic footballers of Honduras
Footballers at the 2012 Summer Olympics
2013 Copa Centroamericana players
2013 CONCACAF Gold Cup players
Liga Nacional de Fútbol Profesional de Honduras players
C.D. Victoria players
Club Nacional de Football players
Real C.D. España players
C.D. Real Sociedad players
Expatriate footballers in Uruguay